John "Grizzly" Adams (c. 1812–1860) was a California mountaineer and grizzly bear tamer.

Grizzly Adams may also refer to:
 The Life and Times of Grizzly Adams (1974–1982), television and film series
Grizzly Adams Wolfsburg, German professional ice hockey team

See also
Adams State Grizzlies, collegiate sports teams